The 6th Cavalry Brigade was a tactical formation of the United States Army which served in the Second World War before being disbanded following the end of the Cold War.

Formation
On 15 August 1927 the 6th Cavalry Brigade was constituted as part of the unorganised and newly formed 3rd Cavalry Division.  Until 1932 the brigade didn't maintain a headquarters and was assigned to the VII Corps Area.  The brigade was organised as follows after formation:

 6th Cavalry Brigade
 Headquarters and Headquarters Troop — HQ Troop disbanded by 1932
 3rd Cavalry Regiment
 6th Cavalry Regiment
 6th Machine Gun Squadron — disbanded in 1928

From 1928 to 1931 the brigade was redesignated as 'Regular Army Inactive' and maintained training through an affiliation with the 14th Cavalry Regiment, and conducted training at Fort Des Moines, Iowa.  On 1 May 1932 the brigade was withdrawn from the VII Corps Area and subsequently allocated to the III Corps Area.  During the brigade's time as part of the III Corps Area, the regiment was deemed 'inactive'.

By July 1933 the brigade was organised with personnel from the Organized Reserves.  On 1 June 1936 the brigade was withdrawn from the III Corps Area and allotted back to the VII Corps Area.  By December 1939 the brigade was organised in Des Moines, Iowa.  However, the brigade was disbanded on 10 October 1940.

By the time the brigade was disbanded, it was organised as follows:

 6th Cavalry Brigade
 Headquarters and Headquarters Troop (Organized Reserves), in Des Moines, Iowa
 3d Cavalry Regiment, at Fort Myer, Virginia
 6th Cavalry Regiment, at Fort Oglethorpe, Georgia

World War II
On 21 April 1942, the 6th Tank Group was constituted in the Army of the United States, continuing the lineage of the old 3rd Cavalry Brigade.  On 23 April, the group was activated at Camp Bowie, Texas.  On 1 February 1944 the group was redesignated as the 6th Armored Group.  The group went on to fight during the Battle of Normandy, and the subsequent North West Europe Campaign, including the Crossing of the Rhine, Battle of the Bulge, and Advance into Western Germany.  On 22 October 1945 the group was inactivated at Camp Myles Standish, Massachusetts, and disbanded 2 July 1952.

Cold War
On 21 February 1975 the 6th Cavalry Brigade was reconstituted at Fort Hood, Texas in the Regular Army and subsequently assigned to the III Corps.  By 1989 the brigade added the suffix '(Air Combat)', and was organised as follows:

 6th Cavalry Brigade (Air Combat)
 Headquarters and Headquarters Troop, at Fort Hood, Texas
 1st Squadron, 6th Cavalry Regiment (18x Boeing AH-64 Apache, 13x Bell OH-58C Kiowa, 3x Sikorsky UH-60A Black Hawk)
 3d Squadron, 6th Cavalry Regiment (18x Boeing AH-64 Apache, 13x Bell OH-58C Kiowa, 3x Sikorsky UH-60A Black Hawk)
 4th Squadron, 6th Cavalry Regiment (18x Boeing AH-64 Apache, 13x Bell OH-58C Kiowa, 3x Sikorsky UH-60A Black Hawk)
 6th Squadron, 6th Cavalry Regiment (18x Boeing AH-64 Apache, 13x Bell OH-58C Kiowa, 3x Sikorsky UH-60A Black Hawk) — activated 6 June 1990
 7th Squadron, 6th Cavalry Regiment (18x Boeing AH-64 Apache, 13x Bell OH-58C Kiowa, 3x Sikorsky UH-60A Black Hawk) — Army Reserve unit, in Houston, Texas
 2d Battalion, 58th Aviation Regiment (Air Traffic Control)
 2d Battalion, 158th Aviation Regiment (32x CH-47D)

While based at Fort Hood the brigade also had a small Pathfinder detachment assigned. 

In the autumn of 1990, two subordinate units of the brigade (including the 2nd Battalion, 158th Aviation Regiment), were deployed to Saudi Arabia.  These units would go on to take part in Operation Desert Shield and later Operation Desert Storm.

Modern Day
On 16 June 2005, both the 6th Cavalry Brigade and the 17th Aviation Brigade were inactivated and their assets were merged into the Combat Aviation Brigade, 2d Infantry Division, thus ending the lineage.

Heraldry

Distinctive Unit Insignia
Description

 A silver color metal and enamel device 1 5/16 inches (3.33cm) in height overall consisting of a red enameled shield with a silver border bearing a black bucking horse in front of a six-pointed star and surmounting overall a silver pentagon, point up.

Symbolism

 The horse and the six-pointed star, a symbol for guidance and achievement, represent the historical origin and great tradition of the Cavalry.
 The six points of the star further allude to the numerical designation of the Brigade.
 The pentagonal background, a symbol of perfection, also refers to the five campaigns credited the organization for service in France and Germany during World War II.

Background

 The insignia was approved on 21 Feb 1975.

Shoulder Sleeve Insignia
Description

 A heater-shaped shield 2 5/16 inches (5.87cm) in width and 3 ¼ inches (8.26cm) in height overall with a 1/8 inch (.32cm) black border around a field divided diagonally from upper right to lower left with scarlet above and white below and just below center two crossed yellow sabres with hilts to base
 COMBAT SERVICE IDENTIFICATION BADGE: A silver color metal and enamel device 2 inches (5.08 cm) in height consisting of a design similar to the shoulder sleeve insignia.

Symbolism

 The colors red and white are the old guidon colors of Cavalry units and the crossed sabres are adopted from the former Cavalry branch insignia.

Background

 The insignia was approved 21 Feb 1975
 (TIOH Drawing Number A-1-582)

Footnotes

References
 Lieutenant Colonel (Ret.) Steven E. Clay, U.S. Army Order of Battle 1919–1941, Volume 2 The Arms: Cavalry, Field Artillery, and Coast Artillery, 1919–41. Fort Leavenworth, Kansas.

Military units and formations established in 1927
Military units and formations established in 1942
Military units and formations established in 1975
Military units and formations disestablished in 1940
Military units and formations disestablished in 1945
Military units and formations disestablished in 2005
Cavalry brigades of the United States Army